Floyd "Jelly Roll" Gardner (September 27, 1895 - March 28, 1977) was a baseball player in the Negro leagues. He played infield and outfield from 1919 to 1933, primarily for the Chicago American Giants.

References

External links
 and Baseball-Reference Black Baseball stats and Seamheads
Negro League Baseball Museum
They Called Him Jelly

Chicago American Giants players
Detroit Stars players
Lincoln Giants players
Homestead Grays players
1895 births
1977 deaths
Leopardos de Santa Clara players
American expatriate baseball players in Cuba
20th-century African-American sportspeople
Baseball outfielders